Jerry Robinson (March 9, 1939 – January 13, 2013) was a professional American football player who played wide receiver for four seasons for the San Diego Chargers and New York Jets.

References

1939 births
American football wide receivers
San Diego Chargers players
New York Jets players
Grambling State Tigers football players
2013 deaths
American Football League players
People from Dodson, Louisiana
Players of American football from Louisiana